Orla Fitzgerald is an Irish actress for stage and screen for over 25 years.

She received two nominations for Best Supporting Actress and Best Breakthrough Artist at the fourth annual Irish Film and Television Awards for her work as Sinéad Ní Shúilleabháin in Ken Loach'sThe Wind That Shakes the Barley. Fitzgerald was nominated best actress in the Irish Times Irish Theatre Awards (2013) for the role of Clare in Digging for Fire, written by Declan Hughes and directed by Matt Torney for Rough Magic Theatre Company. Most recently she has been embracing her Cork heritage in the role of Orla in The Young Offenders.

Training and early career
Fitzgerald took drama classes in Crawford Art Gallery in Cork, placed there by her mother, who thought she was perhaps too shy.  “It was a 90-minute workshop on a Saturday morning, where we did improv and plays. It was all about fun and being creative and I loved it,” the actress has said.

Selected filmography
Crossed Lines, 2001
Strangers in the Night, 2002
The Wind That Shakes the Barley, 2006
Speed Dating, 2007
The Guarantee, 2014

TV work
Love is the Drug, 2004
The Baby Wars, 2005
The Last Furlong, 2005
Holby Blue, 2008
Pure Mule: The Last Weekend, 2009
Law & Order: UK, 2009
The Young Offenders, 2018

Selected stage career
 The Comedy of Errors, Royal Exchange, Manchester
 Crestfall, Theatre503, London
 Pumpgirl, Traverse Theatre, Edinburgh; 3 to 27 August 2006; Bush Theatre, London; 12 September to 14 October 2006
 This Ebony Bird, Blood in the Alley Theatre Company, Ballydehob, Ireland
 The System; The Project, Raw Productions, Dublin
 The Day I Swapped My Dad For Two Goldfish; The Ark, Dublin
 Playboy of the Western World; Royal Exchange, Manchester
 A Town Called F**cked; Last Serenade Theatre Company
 Macbeth; Second Age Theatre Company, Dublin
 A Quite Life; Peacock Theatre, Dublin
 The River; Meridian Theatre Company
 Who's Breaking?; Graffiti Theatre Company, Cork
 Laodamia; Merlin International Theatre, Budapest
 Disco Pigs; Corcadorca Theatre Company, Cork
 Othello; Everyman Theatre, Cork
 The Beauty Queen of Leenane; Lyric Theatre (Hammersmith), London (2021)

Selected radio career
 Enda Walsh’s 4 Big Days in the Life of Dessie Banks

References

External links

1978 births
Living people
Irish film actresses
Irish stage actresses
Irish television actresses
Actresses from Cork (city)